Northumberland Boroughs was an electoral district of the Legislative Assembly in the Australian state of New South Wales from 1856 to 1859, including the towns of Morpeth, East Maitland, and West Maitland, and named after Northumberland County. It elected two members simultaneously, with voters casting two votes and the first two candidates being elected.

Members for Northumberland Boroughs

Election results

References

Former electoral districts of New South Wales
1856 establishments in Australia
1859 disestablishments in Australia
Constituencies established in 1856
Constituencies disestablished in 1859